Eddie "Guitar" Burns (February 8, 1928 – December 12, 2012) was an American Detroit blues guitarist, harmonica player, singer and songwriter. His career spanned seven decades. Among Detroit bluesmen, Burns was deemed to have been exceeded in stature by only John Lee Hooker.

Biography
Burns was born in Belzoni, Mississippi. His father was a sharecropper who performed as a singer in medicine shows, but Burns was raised mainly by his grandparents. He was self-taught in playing the harmonica and made his first guitar.

Burns was initially influenced by the music of Sonny Boy Williamson I and Big Bill Broonzy. He relocated from the Mississippi Delta via Waterloo, Iowa, to Detroit in 1948. Originally Burns excelled at playing the harmonica, and his debut single, "Notoriety Woman" (1948), featured this ability accompanied by the guitar playing of John T. Smith. Burns told of meeting John Lee Hooker there: "Well see, John T. and me was playing at a house party this particular Saturday night. We was in Detroit Black Bottom. ... so Hooker was on his way home from somewhere – I guess he was at some other party, house parties used to be real plentiful here. Hooker heard it, knocked at the door, and they let him in. He introduced himself and he sat down and played some with us. And then, he liked the way I was blowing harmonica. ... he had a session coming up on Tuesday, this was on a Saturday. And so then, he wanted to know if I wanted to do this session with him on Tuesday. And I told him, yes, naturally. So that's how John T. and me went down to cut for Hooker. When we got through the man wanted to know what I had. I had one song, 'Notoriety Woman.' And so he said I'd need two, and I sat there and made up 'Papa's Boogie.'" By the following year Burns was playing guitar accompaniment on recordings by Hooker.

Billed as Big Daddy, Little Eddie, or Big Ed, he performed regularly in Detroit nightclubs but had to supplement his earnings by working as a mechanic. In those early years Burns's own recording was not prolific, with just a handful of tracks released on several labels. His output veered from Detroit blues to R&B as the 1960s progressed, when he issued a number of singles for Harvey Fuqua's Harvey Records. Now permanently billed as Eddie "Guitar" Burns, he appeared on Hooker's album The Real Folk Blues (1966).

In 1972, Burns undertook a European tour and recorded his debut album, Bottle Up & Go, in London, both organised by Jim Simpson of Big Bear Records, who was the first to insert the epithet "guitar" into Burns's name. This was followed by an appearance at the Ann Arbor Blues and Jazz Festival in 1973. Two years later he toured Europe again, this time as part of Big Bear's American Blues Legends '75 tour, featuring on the album of the same name and cutting the Detroit Blackbottom LP as leader.

A song he wrote, "Orange Driver", was recorded by the J. Geils Band for its album Hotline (1975). In August 1976, Burns performed his song "Bottle Up & Go" live on the British television program So It Goes.

In 1989 Burns released the album Detroit for Blue Suit Records, in which his abilities on both guitar and harmonica were displayed. In February 1992, Burns appeared alongside Jack Owens, Bud Spires, and Lonnie Pitchford at the seventh annual New York Winter Blues Festival. By 1994, Burns had been granted the Michigan Heritage Award.

In 1998, the Detroit Blues Society presented Burns with its Lifetime Achievement Award.

His brother Jimmy Burns is a soul blues musician who lives in Chicago and played guitar on Burns's 2002 album Snake Eyes. Burns's final record was Second Degree Burns, released when he was 77 years old.

In 2008, Little Sonny performed with Burns at the Motor City Blues & Boogie Woogie Festival. It was Burns's final live performance.

Burns died of heart failure in December 2012, at the age of 84.

Discography

Studio albums
Bottle Up & Go (1972), Action (under licence from Big Bear Records)
Detroit Blackbottom (1975), Big Bear Records
Lonesome Feeling (1986), (Black & Blue Records BB455.2), recorded in the Netherlands
Detroit (1989), Blue Suit
Snake Eyes (2002), Delmark Records
Second Degree Burns (2005), Blue Suit

Compilations
Treat Me Like I Treat You (1985), Moonshine

Singles
"Notoriety Woman" (1948), Palda Records
"Hello Miss Jessie Lee" (1953), DeLuxe Records
"Biscuit Baking Mama" (1954), Checker Records
"Treat Me Like I Treat You" (1957), Chess Records
"Orange Driver" (1961), Harvey Records
"The Thing to Do" (1961), Harvey Records
"(Don't Be) Messing with My Bread" (1962), Harvey Records
"Wig Wearin' Woman" (1965), Von Records
"I Am Leaving" (1965), Von Records
"Don't Even Try It" (1982), Red Bird Records

Appearances
With John Lee Hooker
The Real Folk Blues (Chess, 1966)
More Real Folk Blues: The Missing Album (Chess, 1966 [1991])

Quotation

See also
List of Detroit blues musicians
List of harmonica blues musicians

References

External links
 Photographs at Backstagegallery.com
 Illustrated Eddie & Jimmy Burns discography

American blues guitarists
American male guitarists
American blues harmonica players
Blues musicians from Mississippi
American blues singers
American male singers
Songwriters from Mississippi
Detroit blues musicians
Harmonica blues musicians
Singers from Mississippi
1928 births
2012 deaths
People from Belzoni, Mississippi
Guitarists from Mississippi
20th-century American guitarists
20th-century American male musicians
Black & Blue Records artists
American male songwriters